The Osa Fjord is a branch of the Eid Fjord and the Hardanger Fjord fully located within the municipality of Ulvik in Vestland county, Norway.

On the west side, the Ulvik Fjord extends to the north to the municipal center of Ulvik. The outermost part of the Osa Fjord is also known as the Bagns Fjord, named after the headland where the fjord starts.

At Bruravik there was formerly a ferry connection across the Eid Fjord to Brimnes in the municipality of Eidfjord. Norwegian County Road 572 runs along the west side of the Osa Fjord starting at Bruravik before it enters the Ulvik Fjord and continues to Ulvik. At Ulvik it intersects with Norwegian County Road 300, which again leads to the west side of the Osa Fjord and continues to Osa. The east side of the fjord has no road connections, and the only settlements there are the Bolstad farms near the mouth of the fjord.

See also
 List of Norwegian fjords

References

Fjords of Vestland
Ulvik